Rick & Steve: The Happiest Gay Couple in All the World (also known as Rick & Steve) is a stop motion  adult animated sitcom created by Q. Allan Brocka, who also acts as director. It is a spin-off from Brocka's 1999 short film of the same name, and debuted on the LGBT-focused Logo network in July 2007 and on the Canadian Teletoon's late-night programming block "The Detour" that October.

The second season debuted on November 11, 2008. As of April 2011, there are no plans for a third season.

Overview
The show follows the lives of three gay couples—the titular Rick and Steve, Chuck and Evan, and Dana and Kirsten—as they live in the fictional gay ghetto of West Lahunga Beach and interact with their friends and family. The title is ironic, as all three of the main couples have typical "couple issues"—including Steve actively seeking a three-way with Rick and another man, Kirsten and Dana deciding to have a baby with Rick's sperm, and Chuck and Evan simply trying to be together despite a 31-year age difference between them.

Characters

Main
Rick Brocka Jr. (voiced by Will Matthews): Steve's 30-year-old Filipino American genius husband. He's a homemaker/computer programmer who's "obsessed with cleanliness and science fiction" and a member of the West Lahunga Beach chapter of Gay Men-zuh. He is insecure about his relationship with Steve and prone to overanalyzing minor slights, but very kind and loving. He generally holds the role of the show's everyman figure. Steve's pet name for Rick is Piggy.
Steve Ball (voiced by Peter Paige): Rick's 33-year-old husband. Steve is a well-off real estate broker, despite not being very bright. He's more than a little fixated on his appearance, spending hours in the gym at a time, but personally sees no problem with that. Despite his love for only Rick, he seeks a more exciting sex life. Rick's pet name for Steve is Daddy.
Kirsten Kellogg (voiced by Emily Brooke Hands in Season 1, Jessica-Snow Wilson in Season 2): Kirsten is 28, Rick's best friend from college and Dana's wife. She's considered a lipstick lesbian, though she has been confused for a boy often in her life. She is an artist and also manages Chick Sticks, a sex toy store.
Dana Bernstein (voiced by Taylor M. Dooley): Kirsten's angry 32-year-old bulldyke wife. A project manager with Habitat for Humanity, Dana is misanthropic, misandric and quick to hurl insults, particularly at Steve, but is willing to help Rick and Steve with household repairs when the need arises. She's also in touch with her Jewish heritage, but only in a political sense.  She has a strained relationship with her divorced parents, Saul and Marlene, and had a brother, Dick (the only male she genuinely liked), who was killed when he won the gold medal in gymnastics at the Olympics and a stray javelin struck him while he was on the medal podium.
Chuck Masters (voiced by Alan Cumming): Chuck is 50 years old and Steve's best friend and Evan's boyfriend. He is both HIV-positive and paralyzed from the left testicle down—putting him in a wheelchair. The two are only tangentially connected; he was hit by a car while leaving the clinic after receiving his positive test result. Chuck is an angry, yet truthful, individual. In "Mom Fight", it is revealed that he is a gold star gay (a gay man who was never with a woman). He had sex with a woman in the same episode, and discovered he may be bisexual.
Evan Martinez (voiced by Wilson Cruz): Evan is Chuck's 19-year-old vacuous kept boyfriend. He's addicted to a multitude of drugs, to the point that forgetting to take them for a day completely messes up his system. He's also the most superficial and trendy of all characters and loves to spend time in clubs.
Condoleezza "Condi" Ling (voiced by Margaret Cho): West Lahunga Beach's resident fag hag, or "alternative lifestyle companion" as she prefers to be called. She has been a beard to 17 gay men (the first being Rick) and becomes suicidal whenever they come out of the closet. Because of this, she is on numerous anti-depressants as well as anti-psychotics. However, she still puts on a cheery exterior when she parties every night with Evan, whom she has tried to steal from Chuck. It has also been shown that she takes great pride in being the only straight person in West Lahunga Beach.
Dixie Bernstein-Brocka-Kellogg (voiced by Lori Alan): Kirsten and Dana's baby. The original plan was for Kirsten to bear the child after being artificially inseminated with Rick's sperm — but after Steve was offended that his sperm was apparently not good enough, straining his relationship with Rick, the two secretly decided to both provide sperm for the sample, and then in the process of bringing the sperm home to impregnate Kirsten, Dana accidentally got pregnant when she spilled it on herself. Dana spends almost three weeks in labour before Dixie is finally born, and names her daughter in memory of her deceased brother Dick (who would go by the name Dixie when in drag). Dixie appears to have paranormal powers, possessing the ability to telekinetically attract objects that are out of her physical reach.
Pussy (voiced by Liza del Mundo): Rick and Steve's cat, Pussy is so smart that she sometimes talks to people. She's jealous of Dixie getting all the attention that used to be lavished on her, and frequently plots to get rid of the baby so she can reclaim her rightful place in the pecking order. However, at other times she is shown to be helpful and generous, often suggesting the perfect solution to a seemingly intractable problem or leading the humans to important information that's been hidden from them. Like Dixie, she also appears to have paranormal powers, possessing the ability to conjure a snowstorm — in Southern California — after overhearing another character's wish for a white Christmas.

Family
Joanna (voiced by Lorna Luft): Steve's mother, she is a former Southern belle who is newly divorced from a different former husband each time she appears. Almost all of her former husbands have been named Carlton. She is outrageously racist and homophobic — in her first appearance she is persistently oblivious to the fact that Steve is gay, even going so far as to convince herself that Rick is a woman, and in her second, she is determined to break Rick and Steve up.
Minda (voiced by Liza del Mundo): Rick's mother. Doting, gay-friendly and seemingly psychic, she can tell that Joanna put dog excrement in her adobo just by smelling it through the phone, and frequently calls with the answers to questions she hasn't been asked yet. She is happily married to Rick's father, although he has never been seen saying anything but "Huh?"
Uncle Bakla (voiced by Alec Mapa): Rick's uncle and Minda's brother. Flamboyantly and effeminately gay, he is only too happy to hook up with Rick's rice queen ex-boyfriend Hunter. Minda wishes Rick were more flamboyant like her brother.
Charo Martinez (voiced by Wilson Cruz in Season 1): Evan's mother. Despite being born and raised in California, she speaks with a strong Mexican accent because she learned English from her immigrant nanny rather than her wealthy Hispanic American parents. She gave birth to Evan as a teenager, so she's still only in her early 30s despite having a 19-year-old son. In the Season 2 finale, when a Homeland Security agent is in town to deport people who look like illegal immigrants whether they are or not, Chuck undertakes a My Fair Lady-style project to protect her by transforming her into Hillary Clinton.

Friends
Ebony and Ivory (voiced by Liza del Mundo and Lori Alan): An interracial lesbian couple, even more hyper-PC than Kirsten and Dana. They named their baby Echinacea (spelled as Echanasia in close captioning), and refuse to learn what gender she/he is so that she/he can discover that for her/himself.
Michaela (voiced by Q. Allan Brocka): Dana's ex. Even butcher than Dana, she is twice the height and width of any other character on the show, and is constantly plotting to break Kirsten and Dana up so that she can get back together with Dana. In the episode "It's Raining Pussy" she mistook a stun gun for a sexual toy; however, she ended up enjoying it and considered it to be "The greatest bang I ever had!"
Tyler (voiced by RuPaul): An African-American friend of Steve's from the gym, he is exasperated by Steve's latent racism ("You're totally racist. I mean, I'm one of your best friends, and how many episodes have I even been in?") and the unconscious homophobia of their straight gym partner J.P. (voiced by Darryl Stephens).
Bodiless Mute Blind Latina Lesbian in a Wheelchair is a disembodied head whose inarticulate mumbles are translated by her live-in nurse Jessica (voiced by Margaret Cho).

Other minor characters
Felatia (voiced by Q. Allan Brocka): An African-American drag queen who tends bar at Antoine's Fissure. She also appears as an usher at Steve and Dana's fake wedding, and as the Wicked Witch in a Wizard of Oz parody.
Dylan Ram-Brick (voiced by Billy West): A leatherstud porn star. Rick and Steve once brought him home for a three-way, and discovered that he's actually a transgender man. He's also Felatia's former roommate.
Franz Nerdlinger (voiced by Billy West in Season 1, Q. Allan Brocka in Season 2): The head of Gay Menzuh, he's a nerdy scientist obsessed with comics.
Anderson Pooper (voiced by Billy West): An outrageously sensationalist anchor on the local news channel. He usually serves in brief standalone gags seen when one of the characters is watching television, although in one episode his exposé on lesbian gang violence is central to the storyline.
Hunter (voiced by Billy West): Rick's ex-boyfriend. He is exclusively attracted to Asian guys, to the point that he's physically incapable of even seeing a non-Asian person if there is an Asian around. Ironically, he seems unable to tell the difference between an Asian and a Latino. He owns virtually all of West Lahunga Beach's Chinatown.
Dr. Hunk (voiced by Billy West): A handsome doctor at Ursula Rodriguez Memorial Hospital who makes all the boys swoon.

Guest voices have included Mitch Morris, Mark Hamill, Jim J. Bullock, Jill Bennett, Lance Bass, Andy Dick, Jai Rodriguez, George Takei, Laraine Newman, Bruce Vilanch and Robert Gant. Margaret Cho, Liza Del Mundo and Billy West voice minor characters in addition to their primary roles, and series creator Q. Allan Brocka also contributes minor character voices.

Episodes

Series overview

Season 1 (2007)

Season 2 (2008–09)

Production and release
After the first season aired, Logo renewed the program for a second season, which debuted on November 11, 2008. The show is produced by Toronto-based production studio, Cuppa Coffee Studios.

The animation of the original Rick & Steve shorts was done using Lego blocks and figures, prompting a lawsuit from the company. Though the series no longer uses Lego blocks, it still draws comparison to both them and those by Playmobil.

Home release

Reception
The show is noted particularly for its use of an adult-oriented and "politically incorrect" style of humor, similar in some respects to that of South Park and Family Guy.

Awards
A minor controversy arose in 2008 when Carlo Nardello, an executive with the Italian RAI Television network, criticized Salerno's Cartoons on the Bay animation festival for including a Rick & Steve screening in its 2008 program. However, Rick & Steve went on to win the festival's Pulcinella Award for best series of the year.

Casting director Gillian O'Neill won the Casting Society of America's Atrios Award for Outstanding Achievement in Casting - Animation TV Programming in 2008 for her work on Rick & Steve.

References

External links
 

2007 American television series debuts
2009 American television series endings
2000s American adult animated television series
2000s American LGBT-related comedy television series
2000s American sitcoms
2007 Canadian television series debuts
2009 Canadian television series endings
2000s Canadian adult animated television series
2000s Canadian LGBT-related comedy television series
2000s Canadian sitcoms
American adult animated comedy television series
American stop-motion adult animated television series
American animated sitcoms
Canadian adult animated comedy television series
Canadian stop-motion adult animated television series
Canadian animated sitcoms
HIV/AIDS in television
Gay-related television shows
Lesbian-related television shows
English-language television shows
Logo TV original programming
Teletoon original programming
Animated television shows based on films
2000s American LGBT-related animated television series
Television series by Cuppa Coffee Studios
Fictional LGBT couples
Canadian LGBT-related sitcoms
Canadian LGBT-related animated television series